Hasratein (Desires) is an Indian television soap opera that was telecast on Zee TV in the mid 1990s. It is based on the Marathi novel "Adhantari" by Late Shri Jaywant Dalvi. Hasratein focuses around successes of extra marital relationships.  One of the main story is of Savi, a woman who leaves her husband and maintains an extra-marital relationship with another married man, with both their spouses being aware of the situation. Her actions were due to the fact that years ago, during her childhood, her mother left her father for a young man. The show emphasizes the societal strain placed on marriages in Indian culture, especially roles given to the female spouse resulting in boredom felt by the male spouse.  Hasratein was one of the most popular television shows of the mid and late 1990s. According to Shubhra Gupta, film and television critic, the popularity of the serial "had made it a catalyst for the discussion of issues of marital discord, in spite of the embarrassment the serial generated for many people."

Seema Kapoor played the character of Savi for the first 125 episodes. She was then replaced by Shefali Chhaya, whose work earned her the Zee Woman of the Year award in 1997.

Cast 
 Sana Amin Sheikh as Savi (episodes 1—11)
 Sonal as Savi (episodes 11-44)
 Seema Kapoor as Savi (episodes 45—126)
 Shefali Shah as Savi (episodes 126—209) 
 Ajit Vachhani as Govind Sahai, Savi's uncle
 Rita Bhaduri as Madhvi Sahai, Savi's aunt
 Sejal Shah as Sushma  
 Harsh Chhaya as Krishnakant Trivedi (KT)
 Dharmesh Vyas as Professor Shyam Verma
 Mrinal Kulkarni as Asmita Krishnakant Trivedi
 Mukesh Rawal as Jaman Thakkar
 Cezanne Khan as Yogesh, son of KT and Asmita 
 Aman Khanna / Jiten Lalwani as Satish, son of Savi and Shyam Verma
 Ketaki Dave as Manasi
 Chaitrali Chirmule as Uma (episodes 1—10)
 Sahiba as Uma (episodes 11—17)
 Bhuwan Das as Young Satish
 Yashwant Dutt as Masterji, Sulakshana's husband (episodes 1-10)
 Arup Pal as Vishal, Uma's /Shushma's husband
 Nagesh Bhosle as union leader Kishan Murari
 Sarita Joshi as Shanta Ben
 Bobby Khanna as Kedar, Masterji's Tabla player
 Himani Shivpuri as Sulakshana, mother of Savi
 Neha Pendse as Urja, daughter of Savi and KT
 Anju Mahendru as KT's mother
 Nupur Alankar/Bhairavi Raichura/Rani Agrawal as Rani
 Akash Bhardwaj as Bobby, husband of Rani
 Anand Goradia as Bittu Khanna
 Kalpita Rajopadhye (till 100 episodes)
 Bobby Khanna as Kedar
 Vipra Rawal as Priyanka
 Arup Pal as Vishal
 Mugdha Shah as Satish's Mother
 Kirti sharma as Yogita
 Smita Haya as Urja's Doctor
 Asha Singh as Pooja
 Piyush Acharya as Paddy
 Zubeda Khan as Miss Dalaal
 Harshada Khanvilankar as Chanda
 Divya as BB Publicity Employee
 Purnima Bhave as Namrata
 Deepak Dave as Namrata's father
 Madhumalti Kapoor as Namrata's mother
 Rasik Dave as Bobby Mehra
 Rashmi as Rashmi
 Anang Desai as Mr. Desai
 Rajiv Verma as KT's father
 Mohini as Mohini
 Nimisha Vakharia as BB Publicity Employee
 Amita Choksi as Mr.Pal's Employee
 Master Om Raut as Master Satish
 Rakesh Bidua as Satish's Father
 Suhas Bhalekar as Raghu Dada
 Shamim Mistry as Lata
 Sheetal Joshi as Geeta
 Anita as Anita
 Chilli as Rosy
 Ramesh Rai as Uma's Father
 Jaspal Sandhu as Sushma's Father
 Nayan Bhatt as Sushma's Mother
 Kavita Vaid as Mrs. Almeda
 Alifia Aftab Kapadia as Mrs. Almeda's Servant
 Baby Disha Khanna as Younger Rani
 Vijay Mishra as Shyam's Colleague
 Gopi Bhalla as Shyam's Colleague
 Urmila Amar as Mona
 Muni Jha as Kiran
 Dinyar Contractor as Mansi's Lawyer
 Meenal Padhiyar as Rinku
 Chandrakant Thakkar as Mr.Verma
 Samir Shah as Chetan
 Baby Nida as Younger Yogita
 Master Zenul as Younger Yogesh
 Meghna Roy as Mrs.Pandit
 Kalpana Dewan as Shanta's Mother-in-law
 Sanat Vyas as Mr.J.D
 Shekhar Shukla as Mr. Camerawala
 Kanhaiyalal as Mr. Lal
 Urvi Pal as Raveena
 Vaishali Kelkar as Ruby
 Ghamshyam Nayak as Mr. Tripathi
 Bhakti Bhatt as Jennifer
 Rajendra Butala as Sushma's Boss
 Bhairavi Vaidya as Clara Rodriques
 Bharat Bhooshan as Dealer
 Sanjay Goradia as Mr. Goradia
 Ravi Chauhan as Ravi
 Tara as Zarina
 Sanjay Agrawal as Pooja's Son
 Shernaz Patel as Dolly
 Jai Prakash Mishra as Shanta's Husband
 Raaz Tilak as K.T's Father-in-law

References

External links
An interview with the cast and crew
 Hasratein Streaming on ZEE5

Indian television soap operas
Zee TV original programming
Indian drama television series